Lower Darwen is a village in the unitary borough of Blackburn with Darwen, contiguous with the town of Darwen, in the county of Lancashire. It is located between the towns of Blackburn and Darwen. Nearby places include Ewood and Blackamoor. It is situated in the valley of the River Darwen. 

The former township of Lower Darwen, abolished in the 1890s, extended south to Earnsdale Brook, and included areas now in the town of Darwen.

History
Until the end of the eighteenth century, Lower Darwen was a farming area. The first cotton mill in the village of Lower Darwen was built about the year 1774, by Mr. Thomas Eccles, yeoman and manufacturer. Although this did not have a major impact on the village at first, by the 1820s, the majority of the village was involved in the textile industry.

Lower Darwen is on the Blackburn to Bolton railway line, and the line through the village was opened in 1847. Lower Darwen formerly had a railway station, however, this closed in 1958. There was also a motive power depot north of the station, which closed in the 1960s. Since the 1980s, the village has expanded rapidly, with many new houses being built, including one large estate on the site formerly occupied by ROF Blackburn. 

It is not far from junction four of the M65 Motorway.

A new road was built when the M65 was extended and the junction four created. Originally named Eccleshill Road, the road was renamed to Paul Rink Way in September 2008. Blackburn with Darwen Borough Council has stated it chose this road for the renaming because it would not affect anyone, as there are no houses or business directly on the road. 

On this road is a new housing estate, along with a Premier Inn and Brewers Fayre.

Notable people
Ronald Haworth

References

Geography of Blackburn with Darwen
Villages in Lancashire
Darwen